The second season of the American superhero streaming television series Titans premiered on DC Universe on September 6, 2019, and concluded on November 29, 2019, consisting of 13 episodes. It was executive produced by Akiva Goldsman, Geoff Johns, Greg Berlanti, Sarah Schechter, and Greg Walker, with Walker serving as showrunner for the second consecutive season. Created by Goldsman, Johns, and Berlanti, the series is based on the DC Comics team Teen Titans. Brenton Thwaites, Anna Diop, Teagan Croft, and Ryan Potter return to the main cast from the previous season, joined by season 1 guest stars Curran Walters, Conor Leslie, Minka Kelly, and Alan Ritchson and series newcomers Chelsea Zhang, Joshua Orpin, and Esai Morales. The season also introduces Damaris Lewis, who would join the main cast in the following season. It is currently the only season to feature Zhang and Morales.

The season sees Dick Grayson (Thwaites) form a new Titans team comprising Rachel Roth (Croft), Gar Logan (Potter), and Jason Todd (Walters) in his original San Francisco base. Concurrent with the Titans' return, an old enemy resurfaces in the form of Deathstroke (Morales), whose past conflict with the original Titans team of Dick, Donna Troy (Leslie), Dawn Granger (Kelly), and Hank Hall (Ritchson) caused them to disband. As Deathstroke looks to eliminate the Titans, with his daughter Rose Wilson (Zhang) also taking part in the fight, the heroes face another threat from Cadmus Laboratories when they encounter runaway test subject Conner (Orpin). Meanwhile, Kory Anders (Diop) discovers she is being hunted by her sister Blackfire (Lewis).

A second season of Titans was confirmed in 2018 prior to the premiere of the first season. Filming began the following year and 13 episodes were announced, two more than the 11 episodes of its predecessor. The season was originally planned to feature H.I.V.E. as the Titans' enemies, while Dick would operate under his new mantle of Nightwing after assuming the identity in the initially intended season 1 finale. Before the start of filming, however, the original season 1 finale would be removed and reworked into the second season, which provided a new resolution to the previous season's story in its premiere episode. The second season was subsequently re-envisioned to depict Dick's gradual transformation into Nightwing, with Deathstroke replacing H.I.V.E. Its story was influenced by the 1984 comic arc "The Judas Contract" from Marv Wolfman and George Pérez's The New Teen Titans and the 2003 Teen Titans comics by Johns.

Critical reception to the second season was generally positive. While episodes in the first half and the early 2nd half of the season received positive reviews, the premiere and later episodes were met with a more negative response for the plot, writing, character arcs, and story resolutions. The second season was the last to release on DC Universe following the repurposing of the service into comic distributor DC Universe Infinite and HBO Max's acquisition of its original programming.

Episodes

Cast and characters

Main
 Brenton Thwaites as Dick Grayson / Robin / Nightwing: The leader of the Titans and member of the original team
 Anna Diop as Koriand'r / Kory Anders: An extraterrestrial royal with the ability to absorb and redirect solar energy
 Teagan Croft as Rachel Roth: An empath deriving her powers from her demon father and member of the new Titans team
 Ryan Potter as Gar Logan: A shapeshifter capable of transforming into animals who joins the new Titans team
 Curran Walters as Jason Todd / Robin: Dick's successor as Robin, who becomes part of the new Titans team at Bruce's request
 Conor Leslie as Donna Troy / Wonder Girl: A half-Amazon who helped form the original Titans team
 Afrodite Drossos as young Donna Troy
 Minka Kelly as Dawn Granger / Dove: The tactical half of her and Hank's vigilante duo, previously with the original Titans
 Alan Ritchson as Hank Hall / Hawk: An vigilante and former Titan serving as the aggressive half in his and Dawn's crimefighting duo
 Chelsea Zhang as Rose Wilson: Deathstroke's daughter, who shares his enhanced reflexes and regenerative healing
 Joshua Orpin as Subject 13 / Conner: A genetic clone of Superman and Lex Luthor, possessing the abilities and personality traits of both
 Esai Morales as Slade Wilson / Deathstroke: A biologically-enhanced assassin who has a history with the original Titans

Recurring

 Iain Glen as Bruce Wayne: A billionaire who moonlights as a feared vigilante in Gotham City and Dick's mentor
 Michael Mosley as Dr. Arthur Light: A former physicist who turned criminal after gaining the ability to control light energy
 Chella Man as Jericho: Deathstroke's mute son and Rose's half-brother, who has the power to possess other people's bodies through eye contact
 Mayko Nguyen as Adeline: Jericho's mother and Deathstroke's ex-wife
 Raoul Bhaneja as Walter Hawn: The vice president of special projects at Cadmus Laboratories
 Natalie Gumede as Mercy Graves: The personal security specialist to Lex Luthor, assigned to oversee Cadmus Laboratories
 Demore Barnes as William Wintergreen: Deathstroke's handler and friend

Dog actors Digby, Lacey, and Wrigley portray Krypto, a dog possessing Kryptonian powers who accompanies Conner.

Guest

 Seamus Dever as Trigon: An interdimensional demon with the power to destroy worlds and Rachel's father. Dever also portrays an ice cream truck driver and a drug supplier in the illusions created by Trigon.
 Rachel Nichols as Angela Azarath: Rachel's biological mother, who holds allegiance to Trigon
 Drew Van Acker as Garth / Aqualad: A member of the original Titans from Atlantis possessing hydrokinetic and enhanced physical abilities
 Robbie Jones as Faddei: A royal guard from Tamaran and former romantic interest of Kory
 Ann Magnuson as Jillian: An Amazon monitoring Donna
 Genevieve Angelson as Eve Watson: A scientist at Cadmus Laboratories who created Conner
 Damaris Lewis as Blackfire: A Tamaranean royal and Kory's sister
 Evan Jones as Len Armstrong: A prison guard at the Kane County Correctional Facility
 Orel De La Mota as Rafi: A Kane County inmate who illegally entered the United States after he fled Corto Maltese
 Julian Works as Luis: An undocumented immigrant from Corto Maltese detained in Kane County with Rafi and Santos
 Rey Gallegos as Santos: Rafi and Luis's cellmate and fellow Corto Maltese undocumented immigrant
 McKinley Freeman as Justin Cole: A psychiatrist who encounters Kory in Las Vegas
 Currie Graham as Stuart: The creator of Dick's costume, posing as a shoemaker
 Peter MacNeill as Lionel Luthor: A retired scientist and Lex Luthor's father
 Curtis Lum as Benny: A contact of Dick
 Elizabeth Whitmere as Peg: The sister of Hank and Dawn's farmhand
 Drew Scheid as Faux Hawk: A teenager who poses as Hawk
 Patrick Garrow as cage announcer: The announcer for Hank's cage fights
 Spencer Macpherson as Ellis: A recovering drug addict hired by Hank and Dawn to help manage their farm
 Hanneke Talbot as Selinda Flinders / Shimmer: A metahuman criminal with the ability to alter compounds and elements
 Sarah Deakins as Martha Kent: Superman's adoptive mother
 Oluniké Adeliyi as Mati Matisse: A burlesque dancer formerly in a relationship with Wintergreen
 Sydney Kuhne as Dani: A runaway fleeing from an abusive household
 Ishan Morris as Caleb: Dani's abusive father
 Natalie Morgan as Paris: A pregnant woman who becomes Blackfire's host body on Earth

Payne Novak portrays Lex Luthor and Clark Kent as children.

Production

Development
Ahead of the series' premiere at New York Comic Con in October 2018, Titans was renewed for a second season. At the 2019 San Diego Comic-Con, the second season's premiere was announced for September 6, 2019, on DC Universe and would consist of 13 episodes. Greg Walker returned as showrunner from the first season, who also served as an executive producer alongside Akiva Goldsman, Geoff Johns, Greg Berlanti, and Sarah Schechter.

The season was the last to release on DC Universe due to its original programming moving to HBO Max in 2021 and the repurposing of the service into comic distributor DC Universe Infinite.

Writing
The second season was initially planned to follow the events of the original season 1 finale, which would have seen Dick Grayson assume the identity of Nightwing and establish H.I.V.E. as the Titans' next adversaries. After the original season 1 finale was pulled, elements of the episode were given to the season 2 premiere, which became the resolution of season 1's Trigon story. H.I.V.E. was replaced by Deathstroke, while Dick's arc into Nightwing was re-envisoned to conclude in the season 2 finale.

Casting

Series regulars Brenton Thwaites, Anna Diop, Teagan Croft, and Ryan Potter reprise their roles from the first season as Dick Grayson, Kory Anders, Rachel Roth, and Gar Logan. Season 1 guest stars Curran Walters, Conor Leslie, Minka Kelly, and Alan Ritchson also return as Jason Todd, Donna Troy, Dawn Granger, and Hank Hall, after being promoted to series regular status.

In February 2019, it was announced that Joshua Orpin had been cast as Conner for season two, taking over for body double Brooker Muir in the first season. After the character was teased by co-creator Geoff Johns, Esai Morales was cast as Deathstroke in March 2019, with Chella Man and Chelsea Zhang announced as his children Jericho and Rose. Iain Glen was cast as Bruce Wayne in April 2019, marking the character's first physical appearance after being portrayed by stunt doubles in the first season finale. In June 2019, Natalie Gumede and Drew Van Acker were cast as Mercy Graves and Garth, respectively. Genevieve Angelson was announced as Cadmus Laboratories scientist Dr. Eve Watson the following month. In August 2019, Michael Mosley was revealed to be portraying Dr. Light. Also in August, Oluniké Adeliyi announced on her Instagram she had joined the cast in an undisclosed role that was later revealed as burlesque dancer Mati Matisse and Hanneke Talbot was revealed to be Shimmer. In September 2019, Demore Barnes was revealed to be portraying Wintergreen. Following the character's appearance in an October 2019 trailer, Diop confirmed on her Instagram that Damaris Lewis would be portraying Kory's sister Blackfire, which was also confirmed by Lewis.

Filming
Filming for the second season began on April 2, 2019, and concluded on September 20, 2019. Production was temporarily put on hold in July due to accidental death of special effects coordinator Warren Appleby; the season 2 premiere is dedicated in his memory.

Release

Broadcast
The second season premiered in the United States through DC Universe on September 6, 2019, and concluded on November 29, 2019. Outside the United States, the second season became available for streaming via Netflix on January 10, 2020.

Home media
On March 3, 2020, the second season was released digitally and to DVD and Blu-Ray.

Reception

On Rotten Tomatoes, the second season holds an 81% approval rating based on 21 reviews, with an average rating of 7 out of 10. The critical consensus reads, "Though Titanss sophomore season suffers from a slight slump at the start, it quickly resets itself, building on the momentum from its first season while laying fascinating framework for where the show could go."

The premiere episode "Trigon" was criticized for having story elements originally intended for the season 1 finale. Kevin Yeoman of Screen Rant wrote that the premiere "feels like two distinct episodes roughly stitched together, rather than a proper start to a new season" and "the show's simply carrying too much baggage at the start and is reaching for a conclusion too long after the ostensible end of season 1 to deliver much in the way of a fulfilling resolution or a promising new beginning". Giving the episode a 5.8/10, Jesse Schedeen of IGN called it "an extremely messy episode, with one half tasked with wrapping up Season 1's Trigon storyline and the other laying the groundwork for a new status quo and new villain" and "delivers a very anticlimactic finish to Season 1's story", although he found promise for future episodes. Den of Geek reviewer Aaron Sagers said the premiere "would have served as an excellent season 1 finale", but concluded that "it feels quite a bit like a much-needed course correction for this series" and gave it a 3.5/5.

Following the premiere, early episodes of the season earned a positive reception. In a review for the second episode "Rose", Forbes contributor Linda Maleh called it "the real season premiere" and wrote, "season 2 has taken the best things about season 1, and elevated them". Praising the sixth episode "Conner" and Joshua Orpin's performance in the title role, Sagers said, "it is a strong introduction of the anticipated character, and Titans makes up for the fact we've waited so long in the season for it". Schedeen gave the eighth episode "Jericho" a 9.3/10, which he described as "easily the strongest installment of Titans: Season 2, and a clear contender for the series' best episode overall".

However, the later episodes were received more negatively. In a review for the 11th episode "E.L._.O.", Charles Pulliam-Moore of Gizmodo wrote, "Titans seemingly lost its focus" after the eighth episode and "with just two episodes to go, it doesn't seem possible that the writers are going to be able to wrap things up in satisfying or interesting ways". For the finale "Nightwing", Pulliam-Moore called it "a travesty of epic proportions", criticizing how the episode concluded the season's storylines. The death of Donna Troy in the finale was widely panned as illogical and unnecessary, with several reviewers questioning if electrical discharge from a transmission tower would have been sufficient to kill the character. Although giving the overall episode a 3.5/5, Sagers commented, "Even if I were to accept that Donna couldn't withstand that electrical charge, and even if I could explain why the super-boy [Conner] didn't rush to stop the falling tower, the death played out in cheap fashion, like yet another box that had to be ticked for the finale." Entertainment Weekly's Christian Holub said, "Donna Troy's last-minute death felt so stupidly unnecessary that I can't help but throw up my hands at this whole season finale", describing the scene as "such a stupid death I honestly thought it was a joke at first". Donna's actress Conor Leslie agreed with the criticism during a 2021 interview, noting the episode aired shortly before a Wonder Woman 1984 trailer that depicted Diana Prince unaffected by lightning.

References

External links 
 
 

Titans (2018 TV series) seasons
2019 American television seasons